Karlijn (Karline) Demasure (born 1955) is a Belgian professor of theology teaching at the Pontifical Gregorian University in Rome. Her field of expertise is child sexual abuse in the Catholic Church. Since 2014 she is the Executive Director of the Centre for Child Protection of Gregorian University.

Career
After obtaining in 2003 a PhD on child sexual abuse in the Catholic Church, Demasure worked as a doctoral assistant and assistant professor at the University of Leuven. From 2007 till 2011 she was a researcher for the Interdiocesan Services for Pastoral Care for Families (Belgium) and for the Chaplaincy in the Dutch Military (The Netherlands). From 2008 to 2014 she held the Chair Sisters of Our Lady of the Cross in Christian Family Studies as an associate professor at Saint Paul University Ottawa (Canada). From 2010 to 2014 she was the dean of the faculties of Human Sciences and Philosophy. From 2012 to 2014 Demasure was the president of the Societé Internationale de Théologie Pratique.

From 2014 to 2019 she was the Executive Director of the Centre for Child Protection of the Gregorian University. This centre elaborates e-learning programs in preventing abuse of children and vulnerable persons. In 2016 the CCP started with a diploma course in safeguarding of minors. In 2019 Demasure decided to return to Saint Paul University in Ottawa, Canada, where she now heads the newly established interdisciplinary Centre for Safeguarding Minors and Vulnerable Persons.

References

1955 births
Living people
21st-century Belgian Roman Catholic theologians
Academic staff of KU Leuven
20th-century Belgian Roman Catholic theologians